"Butterfly Effect" (stylized in all caps) is a song by American rapper and singer Travis Scott. It was released by Epic Records on May 15, 2017, as the lead single from Scott's third studio album, Astroworld (2018). The song was written by Scott with Canadian producers Murda Beatz and Felix Leone.

Background
During a performance in Portsmouth, Virginia on May 4, 2017, Scott hinted at the release of new music in a freestyle. Scott can be heard saying: "Dropping new music in a few days. Bout to go crazy for a few days." The song was released alongside two other songs from Scott on SoundCloud, including "A Man" and "Green & Purple", which featured American rapper Playboi Carti.

Reception
Lawrence Burney of Vice magazine said: "'Butterfly Effect' is textbook slurred Scott number, with backing vocals that sounds eerily similar to Migos' 'Slippery.'" Madeline Roth of MTV said the song is "hazy" and "low-key". Similarly, Tom Breihan of Stereogum said: "'Butterfly Effect' is low-key and melodic, with some sharp production from Drake collaborator Murda Beatz."

"Butterfly Effect" debuted at number 99 on the US Billboard Hot 100 on the week of June 17, 2017, and peaked at number 50 following the release of Astroworld. The single was certified quadruple platinum by the Recording Industry Association of America (RIAA) for combined sales and streaming equivalent units of 4,000,000 units in the United States.

Music video
The music video was released on July 13, 2017 via Travis Scott's Vevo channel. It was directed by BRTHR, who also directed the video to Scott's "Goosebumps".

Live performances
On May 17, 2017, Scott performed "Butterfly Effect" for the first time at a show in St. Louis. On August 27, 2017, he performed the chorus of the song with Thirty Seconds to Mars on their song "Walk On Water" at the MTV Video Music Awards. Scott also performed the song at the MTV Europe Music Awards on November 12, 2017.

Personnel
Credits adapted from Tidal.
 Murda Beatz – production
 Felix Leone – co-production
 Thomas Cullison – engineering assistance
 Mike Dean – master engineering
 Blake "Blizzy" Harden – mix engineering, record engineering

Charts

Weekly charts

Year-end charts

Certifications

References

2017 singles
2017 songs
Travis Scott songs
Song recordings produced by Murda Beatz
Songs written by Murda Beatz
Songs written by Travis Scott
Epic Records singles
Experimental hip hop songs